Radford railway station was on the Midland Main Line and Robin Hood Line in Radford, Nottingham.

History
It was opened by the Midland Railway on 2 October 1848. Three passenger trains a day in each direction were provided from Monday to Saturday with two on Sundays. The fare from Nottingham to Radford was 9d. in first class, 6d in second class, and 4d in third class.

In 1870 the Midland Railway approved the construction of the Radford to Trowell line which started at a junction just north of Radford station. Along with the Ambergate to Codnor Park line constructed at the same time, its purpose was to route Lancashire freight traffic via Nottingham to avoid the bottleneck of Derby. The line was nearly 5 miles in length and the contractor was Messrs Eckersley and Bayliss of Derby. Some labour force issues delayed completion of the line until 1874. It formally opened on 1 May 1875. and also served Wollaton Colliery and later Trowell Moor Colliery.

It closed on 12 October 1964. No trace of it remains beyond different coloured brickwork on the A609 road bridge where steps went down to the platform, and some windows which can be seen from the Jubilee Campus of the University of Nottingham

Stationmasters
Mr. Watson ca. 1852 and ca. 1857
William Porter ca. 1859 - 1908 (Formerly stationmaster at Teversall. Also stationmaster at Lenton from 1907)
S. Eaton until 1911 (afterwards stationmaster at Lowdham)
J. Davies 1911 - 1922 (also stationmaster of Basford and Bulwell, afterwards stationmaster at Bath)
S.J. Whitehead 1922 - ???? (also stationmaster of Basford and Bulwell)
P. Marshall ???? - 1938
W.A.J. Slater 1937 - ???? (formerly signalman at Cudworth)

References 

Disused railway stations in Nottinghamshire
Railway stations in Great Britain opened in 1848
Railway stations in Great Britain closed in 1964
Former Midland Railway stations
Beeching closures in England